Jock is a Scottish diminutive form of the forename "John"; It is also a nickname for someone of Scottish origin, as well as being the collective name for Scottish soldiers, collectively known as "the Jocks". It corresponds to Jack in England and Wales. In London the rhyming slang "sweaty" is used as an offensive name for Scots deriving from "Sweaty sock - Jock".

The name may refer to:

In sports
 Jock Aird (1926–2021), Scottish retired footballer
 Jock Archibald (1895–1967), Scottish footballer
 John Jock Blackwood (1899–c. 1979), Australian rugby union player
 Jacques "Jock" Boyer (born 1955), American former cyclist, first American to compete in the Tour de France
 John Jock Butterfield (1932–2004), New Zealand rugby league footballer
 William Jock Callander (born 1961), Canadian ice hockey player
 Horace Jock Cameron (1905–1935), South African cricketer
 John Jock Cameron (footballer), Scottish football player and managers in the 1900s and 1910s
 James Jock Campbell (footballer) (1922–1983), Scottish footballer
 Jock Carter (1910–1992), English footballer
 Jock Climie, Canadian sportscaster and retired Canadian Football League player
 John Jock Collier (1897–1940), Scottish footballer and manager
 James Jock Cordner (1910–1996), Australian rules footballer
 Jock Cumberford, footballer who played in Australia's first three full international matches in 1922
 John Jock Davie (1913–1994), Scottish footballer
 Ephraim Jock Dodds (1915–2007), Scottish footballer
 Jock Doherty (1894–1957), Australian rules footballer
 John Jock Drummond (1870–1935), Scottish footballer
 Jock Edward, Scottish footballer in the 1920s
 Graham Jock Edwards (born 1955), New Zealand former cricketer
 John Jock Espie (1868-?), Scottish footballer
 John Jock Ewart (1891–1943), Scottish football goalkeeper
 Jack Jock Ferguson (1887–1973), Scottish-born American soccer player
 Jock Govan (1923–1999), Scottish footballer
 John Jock Grieve (1887–1955), Scottish footballer
 John Jock Hamilton (1869–1931), Scottish footballer
 Connor Jock Hanvey (1882–1935), American college football player and coach
 John Jock Henderson (footballer, born 1871) (1871–1930), Scottish footballer
 John Jock Henderson (footballer, born 1895) (1895–1957), Scottish footballer
 John Henebry (1918–2007), United States Air Force major general
 Michael James Jock Hobbs (1960–2012), New Zealand rugby union player and All Blacks captain
 Jock Hutcheson, Scottish professional footballer in the 1870s and '80s
 Jack Jock Hutchison (1884–1977), Scottish-American golfer
 John Jock Hutton (1898–1970), Scottish footballer
 John Jock Kirton (1916–1996), Scottish footballer
 Jock Landale (born 1995), Australian basketball player
 John Jock Leckie (1906–1977), Scottish football goalkeeper
 Jock Lineen (born 1928), former Australian rules footballer
 Leonard Jock Livingston (1920–1998), Australian cricketer
 Jock McAvoy, ring name of British boxer Joseph Patrick Bamford (1908–1971)
 John Jock McCorkell (1918–1987), Australian rules footballer
 Jock McDougall (1901–1973), Scottish footballer
 James Jock McHale (1882–1953), Australian rules football player and coach
 Jock McKenzie (Australian footballer) (1911–1989), Australian rules footballer
 Richard John Jock McKenzie (rugby union, born 1892) (1892–1968), New Zealand rugby union footballer
 John Jock McNab (1894–1949), Scottish footballer
 John Jock Menefee (1868–1953), American Major League Baseball pitcher
 Ambrose Jock Mulraney (1916–2001), Scottish footballer
 John Jock Newall (1917–2004), New Zealand footballer
 Jock O'Brien (footballer, born 1909) (1909–1985), Australian rules footballer
 Jock O'Brien (footballer, born 1937), Australian rules footballer
 John Jock Paterson (1926–2000), English footballer
 John Jock Porter (1894–1952), Scottish motorcycle racer
 James Jock Robertson (1898–1970), English footballer
 John Jock Robson (1899–1995), Scottish football goalkeeper
 John Jock Rutherford (1884–1963), English footballer
 Jock Sanders (born 1988), American football player in the Canadian Football League
 John Jock Scott (footballer) (1906–1981), Scottish footballer
 John Jock Semple (1903–1988), Boston Marathon official
 Jock Shaw (1912–2000), Scottish footballer
 John Jock Shearer (1917–1979), Scottish football player and coach
 John Jock Simpson (1886–1959), English footballer
 John Jock Somerlott (1882–1965), American Major League Baseball player
 Thomas Jock Spencer (1928–2003), Australian rules footballer
 John Jock Stein (1922–1985), Scottish football player and manager
 William Stewart (cyclist) (1883–1950), British Olympic cyclist
 Alexander Jock Sturrock (1915–1997), Australian yachtsman
 John Jock Sutherland (1889–1948), American college football player and Hall-of-Fame coach and National Football League coach
 Charles Jock Sutherland (basketball) (born 1928), American basketball coach
 John Jock Taylor (1954–1982), Scottish motorcycle sidecar racer
 John Jock Taylor (footballer, born 1886) (1886–1916), Scottish footballer
 John Jock Taylor (footballer, born 1909) (1909–1964), Scottish footballer
 John Jock Thomson (1906–1979), Scottish football player and manager
 John Jock Turner (born 1943), Scottish former rugby union player
 John Jock Wadley (1914–1981), English sports journalist
 John Jock Wallace, Jr. (1935–1996), Scottish football player and manager, son of Jock Wallace, Sr.
 Jock Wallace, Sr. (1911–1978), Scottish football goalkeeper
 John Jock Walker (1882–1968), Scottish footballer (Swindon Town, Middlesbrough, Reading, Scotland)
 Jock Waters, Scottish rugby union player in the 1930s
 John Jock West (1909–2004), British motorcycle racer
 John Jock White (1897–1986), Scottish footballer
 John Jock Whyte (1921–1998), Scottish footballer
 John Jock Wightman (1912–1964), Scottish footballer
 Jack Jock Wilson (footballer) (1870–after 1900), Scottish footballer
 Jock Young (canoeist), British slalom canoeist, 1981 world champion in the C-2 team event

Soldiers
 John Jock Campbell (British Army officer) (1894-1942), British Army officer and recipient of the Victoria Cross
 Joseph Jock Cunningham (1902-1969), British lieutenant colonel in the Spanish Civil War
 Major C.J.D Jock Haswell, (1919-) British military and intelligence author and former British intelligence officer.
 John Jock Lewes (1913-1941), British Army lieutenant, inventor of the Lewes bomb and founding principal training officer of the Special Air Service
 John Jock Slater (born 1938), retired Royal Navy admiral, First Sea Lord and Chief of the Naval Staff
 Graham Jock Stirrup (born 1949), retired Royal Air Force marshal
 John Jock Wilson (British Army soldier) (1903–2008), British serviceman and oldest D-Day veteran

Politicians and diplomats
 Harold Jock Barnes (1907-2000), New Zealand trade unionist and syndicalist
 John Jock Bruce-Gardyne (1930-1990), British politician
 John Jock Colville (1915-1987), British civil servant
 John Jock Ferguson (1946–2010), Scottish-born Australian politician
 James Jock Haston (1913–1986), British Trotskyist politician
 Frederick James Jock Granter (1921–2012), Australian politician
 John R. "Jock" McKernan Jr. (born 1948), American politician, twice Governor of Maine
 John Jock Mathison (1901–1982), New Zealand politician and cabinet minister
 John Jock Nelson (1908-1991), Australian politician
 John Jock Scott (1947-2009), American politician, lawyer and professor, three-time Louisiana state representative
 John Jock Taylor (diplomat) (1924-2002), British diplomat and ambassador to several countries
 Arthur Jock Tiffin (1896–1955), British union and Labour Party official
 Joseph "Jock" Yablonski (1910-1969), American murdered labor leader
William "Jock" Alves ( 1909–1979), Rhodesian physician and politician

Artists and entertainers
 Jock (cartoonist) (born 1972), British comic book artist Mark Simpson
 Jock Bartley, American rock guitarist
 Jock Gaynor (1929-1998), American actor, producer, and writer
 Jock Macdonald (1897-1960), Scottish-born Canadian painter
 Jock McFadyen (born 1950), British painter
 Jock McIver (1878-1952), a stage name of the English music hall performer best known as Talbot O'Farrell 
 Jock Mahoney (1919-1989), American actor and stuntman
 George Jock Purdon (1925-1998), British poet and songwriter
 Jock Soto (born c. 1965), American former ballet dancer and current instructor
 Jock Sturges (born 1947), American photographer

Other
 John Stanley "Jock" McCormack (born 1981), renowned  Scottish Diesel Mechanic,  Atheist and Conspiracy Theorist . 
 Jock R. Anderson (born 1941), Australian agricultural economist
 John Jock Brown (born 1946), Scottish solicitor and freelance football commentator
 Henry John Jock Delves Broughton (1883-1942), British aristocrat acquitted of murder
 John Jock Campbell, Baron Campbell of Eskan (1912-1994), British businessman
 Jock Carroll (1919-1995), Canadian writer, journalist and photographer
 Gerard Davison (c. 1967-2015), a commander of the Provisional IRA from Northern Ireland
 Richard Jock Kinneir (1917-1994), British typographer and graphic designer who, with Margaret Calvert, designed many of the road signs used throughout the United Kingdom
 Jock D. Mackinlay (born 1952), American information visualization expert
 John Jock McKeen (born 1946), Canadian physician, acupuncturist, author and lecturer 
 Alan John Jock Marshall (1911-1967), Australian writer, academic and ornithologist
 John Jock Phillips (born 1947), New Zealand historian, author and encyclopedist
 Robert Leslie Stewart (1918–1989), Scottish hangman
 John Hay Whitney (1904-1982), American businessman, philanthropist and ambassador
 John Jock Wilson (police officer) (1922–1993), British police officer
 Jock Young (1942–2013), British sociologist and criminologist

See also
 Joc Pederson (born 1992), American Major League Baseball player
 Jock Ewing, a fictional character on the American television seriesDallas

Hypocorisms
Lists of people by nickname